Aliabad-e Farasudeh (also Romanized as ‘Alīābād-e Farasūdeh; also known as ‘Alīābād) is a village in Behnamvasat-e Shomali Rural District, in the Central District of Varamin County, Tehran Province, Iran. At the 2006 census, its population was 2,178, in 548 families.

References 

Populated places in Varamin County